Glenbarry railway station, previously known as Barry was an intermediate stop with a passing loop situated on the Great North of Scotland Railway (GNoSR) line from Cairnie Junction to . There were two platforms at Glenbarry that served the nearby hamlet that lies in what was once Banffshire. The line northwards ran to Tillynaught where it split to reach Banff by a branch line or Elgin by the Moray Coast line.

Barry was opened in 1859 by the Banff, Portsoy and Strathisla Railway, and in 1867 was absorbed by the GNoSR who took over the line, closed 'Barry' in 1863, reopening it as 'Glenbarry' in 1872 and then operating it until grouping in 1923. Passing into British Railways ownership in 1948, the line was, like the rest of the ex-GNoSR lines along the Moray coast, considered for closure as part of the Beeching report and closure notices were issued in 1963.
 Passenger services were withdrawn in May 1968 whilst freight had ceased on 2 November 1964.

Station infrastructure
In 1902 the OS map shows the presence of a water tower, weighing machine, two sidings in a goods yard with a goods shed, two platforms with a footbridge, ticket office, shelters and a signal box. A road over bridge is located nearby. The signal box was operational until 25 June 1966.

The base of the old water tower survived in 1988.

See also
List of Great North of Scotland Railway stations

References
Notes

Sources

External links
RailScot - Banff Portsoy and Strathisla Railway
The Banff Branch

Former Great North of Scotland Railway stations
Railway stations in Great Britain opened in 1859
Railway stations in Great Britain closed in 1863
Railway stations in Great Britain opened in 1872
Railway stations in Great Britain closed in 1968
Disused railway stations in Aberdeenshire
Beeching closures in Scotland
1859 establishments in Scotland
1968 disestablishments in Scotland